John H. & Wilson C. Ely was a father and son architectural firm based in Newark, New Jersey responsible for some of the more prominent buildings built in the city in the early 20th century, many in the Classical Revival style.

Father and son
John H. Ely (June 13, 1851 – April 21, 1932) was born in New Hope, Pennsylvania. Educated in Pennsylvania and New Jersey, he settled in Newark in 1882 as a carpenter and builder, later to become a prominent architect. Involved in civic affairs and a member of the New Jersey Historical Society, he served on Newark City Council, and despite being asked, did not run for the New Jersey Assembly.

Wilson C. Ely, John H's son, spent fifty-seven years both designing and managing the firm.

Works

Among the works the firm designed are:
 Newark City Hall (1906) (with Mowbray and Uffinger)
 Morristown Memorial Hospital (1913)
 J.J. Bridges House (1916) Orlando, Florida
 Mutual Benefit Life Insurance Company Building (1925)
 Home Office Building (1928)
 American Insurance Company Building (1930)
 National Newark Building (1931)
 East Orange City Hall

See also
National Register of Historic Places listings in Essex County, New Jersey
List of tallest buildings in Newark
Grad Associates

References

Architecture firms based in New Jersey
Defunct architecture firms based in New Jersey
Companies based in Newark, New Jersey
History of Newark, New Jersey